Silver City is a town in Humphreys County, Mississippi. The population was 337 at the 2010 census, unchanged from the 2000 census.

The town was first named "Palmetto Home", after a nearby plantation.

Geography
Silver City is located in central Humphreys County at  (33.095335, -90.495814), in the Mississippi Delta region. It is bordered to the east by the Yazoo River. U.S. Route 49W passes through the town, leading north  to Belzoni, the county seat, and south  to Yazoo City. Mississippi Highway 149, an old alignment of US 49W, leads southwest from Silver City  to Louise.

Demographics

As of the census of 2000, there were 337 people, 124 households, and 76 families residing in the town. The population density was 553.7 people per square mile (213.3/km). There were 133 housing units at an average density of 218.5 per square mile (84.2/km). The racial makeup of the town was 21.66% White and 78.34% African American.

There were 124 households, out of which 33.1% had children under the age of 18 living with them, 31.5% were married couples living together, 24.2% had a female householder with no husband present, and 38.7% were non-families. 36.3% of all households were made up of individuals, and 15.3% had someone living alone who was 65 years of age or older. The average household size was 2.72 and the average family size was 3.59.

In the town, the population was spread out, with 30.6% under the age of 18, 9.2% from 18 to 24, 24.0% from 25 to 44, 22.0% from 45 to 64, and 14.2% who were 65 years of age or older. The median age was 36 years. For every 100 females, there were 87.2 males. For every 100 females age 18 and over, there were 68.3 males.

The median income for a household in the town was $22,083, and the median income for a family was $20,000. Males had a median income of $23,125 versus $16,250 for females. The per capita income for the town was $15,459. About 36.6% of families and 49.3% of the population were below the poverty line, including 70.8% of those under age 18 and 38.6% of those age 65 or over.

Education
Silver City is served by the Humphreys County School District.

Notable people
 Spencer Haywood, participated on the US Olympic gold medal-winning basketball team, then played professionally
 Jack Reed, professional baseball player and member of the 1961 World Series champion New York Yankees

References

Towns in Humphreys County, Mississippi
Towns in Mississippi